Not the White House Correspondents' Dinner was an event part of Full Frontal with Samantha Bee to rival the traditional White House Correspondents' Dinner in 2017. The event was announced on January 30, 2017, and took place at the DAR Constitution Hall on April 29, 2017, at the same time as the planned WHCA event. It aired on TBS the same evening at 10:00 p.m. EST, followed by an encore uncensored broadcast at 11:00 p.m. on Twitter.

The event, hosted by Samantha Bee, featured pre-recorded appearances by Allison Janney (reprising her West Wing role as C.J. Cregg), Jake Tapper, Billy Eichner, Robin Thede, Norman Lear, Bridget Everett, Patton Oswalt, River Butcher, Cameron Esposito, Kumail Nanjiani, Carl Reiner, Janelle Reeves, Paula Pell, Jordan Carlos, and Retta. Also appearing live were Peaches performing the theme song from Full Frontal, "Boys Wanna Be Her", and special guest Will Ferrell reprising his imitation of George W. Bush.

The event raised $200,000 for the Committee to Protect Journalists (CPJ).

Segments
 Cold Open: Opens with a parody of a White House style news conference with Allison Janney reprising her role as C. J. Cregg.
 Peaches and Monologue: A musical intro by Peaches – performing Full Frontals theme song "Boys Wanna Be Her", followed by a monologue by Bee.
 Roast of Jeff Zucker: A roast of CNN and its current president Jeff Zucker.
 What Is Facts: A sketch facetiously mixing quantum mechanics with "alternative facts".
 Comedians Roast Trump.
 Fox News In Memoriam: Bee roasts Fox News while calling out Roger Ailes and Bill O'Reilly.
 Jake Tapper: Bee is "interviewed" by Jake Tapper.
 Special Guest George W. Bush: Will Ferrell reprises his Saturday Night Live role as former president George W. Bush.
 Woman in the High Castle: Bee watches a film of herself in an alternate universe, where she is roasting President Hillary Clinton (The Man in the High Castle parody).
 Sammy Bee Roasts the Presidents: Bee roasts presidents; from Woodrow Wilson to Bill Clinton with period-appropriate attire and speech.
 Show Close and Committee to Protect Journalists: Bee announces how much money was raised for the Committee to Protect Journalists, and speaks on the subject of journalistic freedom.
 All The President's Leaks (with Andy Richter) (web extra).

Awards and nominations

See also
 List of dining events
 List of Full Frontal with Samantha Bee episodes
 Rally to Restore Sanity and/or Fear
 Stephen Colbert at the 2006 White House Correspondents' Dinner
 White House Correspondents' Association

References

External links
 Not the White House Correspondents' Dinner on Samantha Bee's official website
 Not the White House Correspondents' Dinner – playlist

2017 in American politics
2017 in Washington, D.C.
American news parodies
American political satire
April 2017 events in the United States
Criticism of journalism
Dining events
Full Frontal with Samantha Bee
Roast (comedy)